Antonio Amato (11 November 1934 – 3 February 2021) was an Italian rower. He competed in the men's eight event at the 1956 Summer Olympics.

References

External links
 

1934 births
2021 deaths
Italian male rowers
Olympic rowers of Italy
Rowers at the 1956 Summer Olympics
Sportspeople from the Province of Foggia